Darwin's theory of evolution was influenced by interpretations of Hindu philosophy, especially reincarnation and human development. Hindus have found support for, or ideas foreshadowing evolutionary ideas, in scriptures, such as the mytheme of Dashavatara, the incarnations of Vishnu starting with a fish.

Reception in India

In India, there were minimal references to Darwinism in the 1800s. While elements of Victorian England opposed the idea of Darwinism, Hindus already had the present notion of common ancestry between humans and animals. While the creation–evolution controversy has seen much debate in US, Middle East and parts of Africa, it is an insignificant issue in India, because of its Hindu-majority population.

Most Indian scientists accept biological evolution and it is taught in Indian universities.

Spiritual evolution

Many Hindu reformers compare the Samkhya philosophy, specifically the term parinama and the concept of evolutes, with Darwinism. David Lagourie Gosling has suggested that Swami Vivekananda based most of his cosmological and biological ideas on Samkhya. Influenced by western thought and esotericism, Vivekananda and Sri Aurobindo developed a view on reincarnation in which an involution of the Divine into matter takes place, and the person has to evolve over multiple lives until the Divine gains recognition of its true nature and liberation is attained.

Hindu creationism

Hindu creationism also known as Vedic creationism is a type of religious old earth creationism. According to Hindu creationists all species on earth including humans have "devolved" or come down from a high state of pure consciousness (Brahman). Hindu creationists claim that species of plants and animals are material forms adopted by pure consciousness which live an endless cycle of births and rebirths. Historian of science Ronald Numbers has commented that "Hindu Creationists have insisted on the antiquity of humans, who they believe appeared fully formed as long, perhaps, as trillions of years ago." The views of Hindu creationism are based on the Vedas, which depict an extreme antiquity of the universe and history of the earth.

The emergence of modern Vedic creationism has been linked to Dayananda Saraswati, the founder of Arya Samaj. In his Satyarth Prakash, Saraswati promoted anti-evolutionary views and took a literal reading of the Vedas. He argued that God designed the physical bodies of all species 1.96 billions years ago on earth and on other planets at the beginning of the present cosmic cycle. He stated that God conjoined the bodies with pre-existing souls and that different species were created and distributed to souls in accord to their karma from the previous cosmic cycle. Saraswati in a public lecture condemned Darwinian evolution but misunderstood common descent by questioning why monkeys no longer evolve into men.

Vedic creationism holds a view of the world derived largely from the Bhagavad Gita. It was promoted by A. C. Bhaktivedanta Swami Prabhupada the founder of ISKCON who referred to Charles Darwin and his followers as "rascals". Vedic creationism was also promoted by ISKCON devotees Michael Cremo and Richard L. Thompson, authors of the 1993 book Forbidden Archeology. They argue that human beings are distinct species that have existed for billions of years. Vedic creationists are known to search for anomalies and reinterpret the fossil record to make it fit with their metaphysical assumptions.

Vanara

The Sanskrit epics of the Hindus mention several exotic creatures including ape-like humanoids. The Ramayana speaks of the Vanaras, an ape-like species (ape-men) with human intelligence, that existed millions of years ago alongside modern humans. Michael Cremo, a Hindu creationist, states:

Dashavatara

The order of the Dashavatara (ten principal avatars of the god Vishnu) is interpreted to convey Darwin's evolution. British geneticist and evolutionary biologist J. B. S. Haldane opined that they are a true sequential depiction of the great unfolding of evolution. According to them, like the evolutionary process itself, the first avatar of God is a fish - Matsya, which depicts aquatic life, then comes the aquatic reptile turtle, Kurma, which depicts creatures moving to land, then a mammal - the boar Varaha, then Narasimha, a man-lion being, which is sometimes taken to mean creatures like Okapi, Archaeopteryx, and others, then comes Vamana, the dwarf hominid. Then Parashurama depicts humans when they were in the caveman stage. And then, Rama depicts the rise of civilization and kingdoms. (Sometimes, when Balarama is taken into account, he is taken to represent the growth of agriculture.) Krishna is taken to symbolize the growth of art and crafts. 9th avatar & Kalki is not yet born. Hinduism mentioned kalki born in kaliyug end period & 9th Avatar coming in half suvarna kaliyug end period.

See also
 Creation myth
 Ichthys
 Relationship between religion and science

References

Sources

Further reading
Evolution theory
Hindu Perspectives on Evolution: Darwin, Dharma, and Design (Routledge Hindu Studies Series), C. Mackenzie Brown, Routledge, 2012,  
 C. Mackenzie Brown (ed.)(2020), Asian Religious Responses to Darwinism: Evolutionary Theories in Middle Eastern, South Asian, and East Asian Cultural Contexts, Springer Nature

Creationism
 Cavanaugh, Michael A. (1983), A Sociological Account of Scientific Creationism: Science, True Science, Pseudoscience. Unpublished doctoral dissertation, University of Pittsburgh.
 Eve, Harold, "Creationist Movement in Modern America", Twayne Pub, 1990.

"Vedic creationism"
Forbidden Archeology: The Full Unabridged Edition, Michael A. Cremo and Richard L. Thompson,   Torchlight Publishing; 2Rev Ed edition, January 1998 
Forbidden Archeology's Impact: How a Controversial New Book Shocked the Scientific Community and Became an Underground Classic, Michael A. Cremo, Torchlight Publishing, January 1998, .
The Hidden History of the Human Race (The Condensed Edition of Forbidden Archeology),  Michael A. Cremo, Torchlight Publishing, May 15, 1999, ISBN 0892133252

Hindu nationalism
Prophets Facing Backward: Postmodern Critiques of Science and the Making of Hindu Nationalism in India, Meera Nanda, Rutgers University Press, 2003.

External links

Hinduism and Science
: Editorial in The Hindu, April 20, 2004.
Dharma vs. Darwin? Swami B.V. Tripurari : Beliefnet article describing Hindu perspectives on evolution
The Perils of Vedic 'Science' , Meera Nanda, Beliefnet article on Hindu science and evolutionary theories.
The Secret Diary of Charles Darwin, Sivasiva Palani: Discussion of contradictions between Hinduism and evolution in Hinduism Today.

Hare Krishna
Michael Cremo Human Devolution
Bhakta Handbook "Evolution and Science"
Hare Krishna on Science
"Life comes from Life" Hare Krishna on Biogenesis

 
Evolution
Point of view
Hindu creation myths